Maritza Janneyh Guamán Maza (born 15 January 1988) is an Ecuadorian race walker. She competed in the women's 20 kilometres walk event at the 2016 Summer Olympics.

References

External links
 

1988 births
Living people
Ecuadorian female racewalkers
Athletes (track and field) at the 2016 Summer Olympics
Olympic athletes of Ecuador
People from Loja, Ecuador
21st-century Ecuadorian women